Henry Hoffstot (born September 23, 1990) is an American rower. He competed for Cambridge University Boat Club in The Boat Race in 2014, 2015, and 2016, serving as the winning President in 2016.

Henry competed at the 2014 World Rowing Championships representing the USA, and was elected Hawks' Club Cambridge University athlete of the year in 2016.

References

1990 births
Alumni of the University of Cambridge
Cambridge University Boat Club rowers
Living people